Anton Løkkeberg (27 December 1927 – 20 April 1985) was a Norwegian footballer. He played in one match for the Norway national football team in 1954.

References

External links
 

1927 births
1985 deaths
Norwegian footballers
Norway international footballers
Place of birth missing
Association footballers not categorized by position